Tanır, historically Kilisecik ( 'little church'), is a village in the Nizip District, Gaziantep Province, Turkey.

References

Villages in Nizip District